Sailing at the 2014 Asian Para Games was held at Wangsan Sailing Marina in Incheon, South Korea, from 19 to 22 October 2014. There were 2 gold medals in this sport.

Medal summary

Medal table

Medalists

Participating nations
A total of 24 athletes from 5 nations competed in sailing at the 2014 Asian Para Games:

Results
Legend
DPI — Discretionary penalty imposed
DNF — Did not finish
OCS — On the course side

Single-Person Keelboat

Two-Person Keelboat

References

External links
Official website

2014 Asian Para Games events